The 4th Assembly District of Wisconsin is one of 99 districts in the Wisconsin State Assembly.  Located in northeast Wisconsin, the district comprises part of central Brown County, including the villages of Ashwaubenon and Allouez, and parts of the city of Green Bay and the village of Howard. The district also contains Lambeau Field (home of the Green Bay Packers) and historic Allouez Catholic Cemetery and Woodlawn Cemetery.  The district is represented by Republican David Steffen, since January 2015.

The 4th Assembly district is located within Wisconsin's 2nd Senate district, along with the 5th and 6th Assembly districts.

History

The district was created in the 1972 redistricting act (1971 Wisc. Act 304) which first established the numbered district system, replacing the previous system which allocated districts to specific counties.  The 4th district was drawn from some of the more densely populated parts of the previous Brown County 2nd district, including the town of De Pere, the city of De Pere, the villages of Bellevue and Allouez, and part of southern Green Bay.

The 1982 court-ordered redistricting plan, which scrambled all State Assembly districts, moved the 4th district to Milwaukee County.  The 1983 redistricting, passed by the Legislature, superseded the court-ordered plan and moved the 4th district back to northeast Wisconsin, but it now spanned a vast—mostly rural—stretch of Oconto, Shawano, and Outagamie counties.  That map remained until the 1992 redistricting, which moved the 4th district back into suburban Brown County, where it has remained through subsequent redistrictings, with some variation in the boundaries and municipalities included.

List of past representatives

References 

Wisconsin State Assembly districts
Brown County, Wisconsin